Edwin J. Brown (1864–1941) was mayor of Seattle, elected in May, 1922, and again in 1924. He graduated from  Kansas City School of Law in 1899, and worked as a dentist, thus earning the moniker "Doc" Brown. As a politician during prohibition, Brown personally did not drink alcohol, but supported the public's right to drink.

When Brown left to attend the 1924 Democratic National Convention, he appointed city council member Bertha Knight Landes as acting mayor. Landes began her own law and order campaign, firing Police Chief William B. Severyns for corruption and closing down lotteries, punchboards and speakeasies. Upon his return, Brown reinstated the police chief. In 1926, Brown ran for a third term, but lost to Landes.

He died on July 28, 1941, at the age of 76, of a heart attack.

See also
 Anna A. Maley
 Socialist Party of Washington
 Wage Workers Party

Further reading

References

Mayors of Seattle
1864 births
1941 deaths
American socialists
Washington (state) socialists